Cape Confusion is a rocky point which projects from the southwest part of the Northern Foothills,  northwest of Cape Russell, on the coast of Victoria Land in Antarctica. It was visited by the Southern Party of the New Zealand Geological Survey Antarctic Expedition, 1962–1963, which gave the name because of the complex geological structure of the area.

References 

Headlands of Victoria Land
Scott Coast